Nathan Willems is a Democrat representing the 29th District in the Iowa House of Representatives since 2009. He holds a Bachelor of Science in Foreign Service from Georgetown University's Edmund A. Walsh School of Foreign Service (2001) and a Juris Doctor from the University of Iowa College of Law (2007).

, Willems serves on Iowa House committees for Education (ranking member), Labor, and Ways and Means. He also sits on the Education Appropriations Subcommittee. He was elected in 2008, defeating Republican opponent Emma Nemencek and was re-elected in 2010.

Willems was a field organizer for Congressman Leonard Boswell's 1998 reelection campaign. He managed two Iowa House races in 2000. In 2001 he worked on the unsuccessful United States House campaigns of John Norris and Julie Thomas. He was a legislative clerk for Iowa Representative Ro Foege, whom he later succeeded in the Iowa House. He was a regional director for Howard Dean's Iowa caucus campaign. He worked one summer in the legal department of Iowa Union of Operating Engineers Local 49 before taking his current job as an attorney at Rush & Nicholson, P.L.C., practicing labor and employment law.

Nate is active in the Linn County Democratic Central Committee, the Lisbon Lincoln Highway Lions Club, the Mount Vernon Athletic Boosters, and is First Vice President of the Iowa Federation of Teachers.

Electoral history
*incumbent

References

External links

 
 Representative Nathan Willems official Iowa General Assembly site
Nathan Willems State Representative official constituency site
 

Democratic Party members of the Iowa House of Representatives
Living people
Walsh School of Foreign Service alumni
University of Iowa College of Law alumni
Iowa lawyers
People from Anamosa, Iowa
People from Linn County, Iowa
Year of birth missing (living people)